Howard John Wakefield (April 2, 1884 – April 16, 1941) was a professional baseball player in Major League Baseball from 1905 to 1907. Wakefield was a 6-foot, 1 inch, catcher who threw right-handed and batted right-handed. Wakefield played the 1905 and 1907 seasons with the Cleveland Indians. His 1906 season was with the Washington Senators.

A native of Bucyrus, Ohio, he was the father of Dick Wakefield who was also a professional baseball player during the 1940s and early 1950s.

Wakefield died in Chicago, in 1941.

See also
 List of second generation MLB players

Sources
 Baseball Reference

Specific

1884 births
1941 deaths
Cleveland Indians players
Washington Senators (1901–1960) players
Major League Baseball catchers
Baseball players from Ohio
People from Bucyrus, Ohio
Minor league baseball managers
Des Moines Underwriters players
Indianapolis Indians players
Toledo Mud Hens players
San Antonio Bronchos players
Springfield Watchmakers players
Rockford Wakes players